Ali Mohamed Warancadde is a Somali politician. He formerly served as the Minister of Interior of Somaliland in Silanyo's administration, he also served as the Minister of Civil Aviation of Somaliland in Riyale's administration.

See also

 Ministry of Civil Aviation (Somaliland)
 Ministry of Interior (Somaliland)
 Politics of Somaliland
 Cabinet of Somaliland

References

|-

Living people
Somaliland politicians
Interior Ministers of Somaliland
Civil Aviation Ministers of Somaliland
Year of birth missing (living people)